Jüri Jaanson (born 14 October 1965) is the most successful Estonian rower of all time and the winner of five medals at World Rowing Championships. He became World Champion in Tasmania 1990 in the single sculls event. 14 years later, at age 38 he won an Olympic silver medal in the single sculls event at the 2004 Summer Olympics in Athens. In Beijing 2008 he won his second Olympic silver medal, this time in the double sculls event with Tõnu Endrekson and became Estonia's oldest Olympic medal winner with the age of 42 years, 10 months and two days. He is a member of the SK Pärnu rowing club located in Pärnu. In 2007, Jaanson became the oldest rower ever to win a World Cup event at the age of 41 in Amsterdam.

Jaanson was born in Tartu, and had to overcome a particularly challenging childhood, brought on by a severe case of pneumonia at the age of 2.  Doctors gave antibiotics which saved him, but which also left him almost completely deaf.  He attended a school for the deaf until he obtained a primitive hearing aid at the age of 12, allowing him to attend a regular school.  Still, being a loner, he struggled with fitting in.  At Tartu University, when a coach introduced him to rowing, he took to it passionately, in fact so passionately that he left the University to focus on rowing.  He wears hearing aids on a regular basis and was also seen wearing them during his rowing competitions.

Jaanson is among four athletes to compete in rowing at six Olympics, with Romanian Elisabeta Lipă in 2004, Canadian Lesley Thompson (cox) in 2008, and Australian James Tomkins.

On 18 November 2010, Jaanson announced ending his career. In July 2011 he was awarded with the Thomas Keller Medal, the highest honor in rowing.

He is also a member of the Estonian parliament, the Riigikogu for the Reform Party.

Olympic Games
 1988 Seoul – 8th Single sculls
 1992 Barcelona – 5th Single sculls
 1996 Atlanta – 18th Single sculls
 2000 Sydney – 6th Single sculls
 2004 Athens –  Single sculls
 2008 Beijing –  Double sculls (with Tõnu Endrekson)

World Championships
 1989 Bled, Yugoslavia –  Single sculls
 1990 Tasmania, Australia –  Single sculls
 1991 Vienna, Austria – 12th Single sculls
 1995 Tampere, Finland –  Single sculls
 1997 Aiguebelette, France – 13th Single sculls
 1998 Cologne, Germany – 14th Single sculls
 1999 St. Catharines, Canada – 7th Single sculls
 2001 Luzerne, Switzerland – 7th Single sculls
 2003 Milan, Italy – 7th Single sculls
 2005 Gifu, Japan –  Quadruple sculls (with Andrei Jämsä, Tõnu Endrekson and Leonid Gulov)
 2007 Munich, Germany –  Double sculls (with Tõnu Endrekson)

European Championships
 2008 Marathon, Greece –   Quadruple Sculls (with Tõnu Endrekson, Andrei Jämsä and Allar Raja)

Rowing World Cup

Overall wins
 Single sculls: 1990, 1995
 Quadruple sculls: 2005
 Double sculls: 2007

See also
 List of athletes with the most appearances at Olympic Games

References

External links
 
 
 
 
 

 World Rowing Magazine August 2007
 World Rowing Magazine Athlete of the Month March 2010

1965 births
Living people
Sportspeople from Tartu
Estonian Reform Party politicians
Estonian male rowers
Rowers at the 1988 Summer Olympics
Rowers at the 1992 Summer Olympics
Rowers at the 1996 Summer Olympics
Rowers at the 2000 Summer Olympics
Rowers at the 2004 Summer Olympics
Rowers at the 2008 Summer Olympics
Olympic rowers of the Soviet Union
Olympic rowers of Estonia
Olympic silver medalists for Estonia
Estonian sportsperson-politicians
Olympic medalists in rowing
Medalists at the 2008 Summer Olympics
World Rowing Championships medalists for Estonia
World Rowing Championships medalists for the Soviet Union
Medalists at the 2004 Summer Olympics
21st-century Estonian politicians
Thomas Keller Medal recipients
European Rowing Championships medalists
Members of the Riigikogu, 2011–2015
Members of the Riigikogu, 2015–2019
Members of the Riigikogu, 2019–2023
Estonian deaf people